Mona-Lisa Englund (later Crispin, 3 February 1933 – 2 September 1999) was a Swedish athlete, who competed in track and field athletics, figure skating, handball and badminton among other sports. Her best achievement was fourth place in the pentathlon at the 1950 European Championships.

Athletics
Englund finished fourth in the pentathlon at the 1950 European Championships. She won national titles in the 80 m hurdles (1949–51), high jump (1950), triathlon (1949–50) and pentathlon (1951) and held national records in triathlon and pentathlon.

Figure skating

In 1951 Englund won a junior national title in pair skating. Later, competing with Ronny Hall in senior pairs, she placed second at the 1956 Nordic Figure Skating Championships and at the 1956 Swedish Figure Skating Championships; she finished third in 1955.

Handball
Between 1949 and 1956 Englund won three Nordic Championships and eight national titles with Kvinnliga IK Sport. She played 16 international matches for Sweden.

Badminton
In 1951 Englund won junior national badminton titles in singles and doubles.

Personal life
In 1960, she married Carl Anders Henry Crispin (1928–2008), changed her last name and retired from competitions. She had a daughter (born 1960) and a son (1962–1997). In 1969–1977 she wrote a few books about figure skating.

Publications
 – translated into Danish and Finnish

References

Further reading 
  

1933 births
1999 deaths
Swedish female pair skaters
Swedish pentathletes
Swedish female handball players
Swedish female badminton players